This is a list of the main career statistics of professional Slovak tennis player Daniela Hantuchová.

Performance timelines

Only main-draw results in WTA Tour, Grand Slam tournaments, Fed Cup and Olympic Games are included in win–loss records.

Singles

Doubles

Grand Slam finals

Doubles: 3 (3 runner-ups)

Mixed doubles: 5 (4 titles, 1 runner-up) 
By winning the 2005 US Open title, Hantuchová completed the mixed doubles Career Grand Slam. She became only the fifth female player in history to achieve this.

Other significant finals

WTA Premier Mandatory & 5 finals

Singles: 3 (2 titles, 1 runner-up)

Doubles: 7 (2 titles, 5 runner-ups)

WTA career finals

Singles: 16 (7 titles, 9 runner-ups)

Doubles: 21 (9 titles, 12 runner-ups)

ITF titles

Singles: 3 titles

Doubles: 1 title

Fed Cup results

Singles

Doubles

WTA Tour career earnings
Hantuchová earned more than 10 million dollars during her career.

Record against other players

Record against top 10 players
Hantuchová's record against players who have been ranked in the top 10. Active players are in boldface.

No. 1 wins

Top 10 wins

Notes

References

Tennis career statistics